The seventeenth season of Saturday Night Live, an American sketch comedy series, originally aired in the United States on NBC between September 28, 1991, and May 16, 1992.

Cast
A. Whitney Brown, Jan Hooks and longtime Weekend Update anchor Dennis Miller all left the show. Kevin Nealon was promoted to Weekend Update anchor. New cast members included Ellen Cleghorne, Siobhan Fallon and writer Robert Smigel. Beth Cahill and Melanie Hutsell also later joined the cast. Chris Farley, Chris Rock and Julia Sweeney were upgraded to repertory status, while Tim Meadows remained in the middle group. Adam Sandler, Rob Schneider and David Spade were promoted to the middle group.

This was the final season for Victoria Jackson (at the time, she became the longest serving female cast member, with a total of six seasons on the show. She was later surpassed by Molly Shannon in season 26). This would be Beth Cahill and Siobhan Fallon's only season on the show.

Cast roster

Repertory players
Dana Carvey
Chris Farley
Phil Hartman
Victoria Jackson
Mike Myers
Kevin Nealon
Chris Rock
Julia Sweeney

Middle players
Ellen Cleghorne
Siobhan Fallon
Tim Meadows
Adam Sandler
Rob Schneider
David Spade

Featured players
Beth Cahill (first Episode: November 16, 1991)
Al Franken
Melanie Hutsell (first episode: November 16, 1991)
Robert Smigel

bold denotes Weekend Update anchor

Writers

Episodes

Specials

Wayne's World film
Wayne's World, a film based on the popular "Wayne's World" sketches, was released on February 14, 1992. Cast members Dana Carvey, Brian Doyle-Murray, Chris Farley and Mike Myers appear in the film. The film received positive reviews and was commercially successful, becoming the highest grossing SNL film to date. A sequel was produced in 1993, titled Wayne's World 2.

References

17
Saturday Night Live in the 1990s
1991 American television seasons
1992 American television seasons